Vitti is a surname. Notable people with the surname include:

João Vitti (born 1967), Brazilian actor
Jon Vitti (born 1960), American television writer
Mario Vitti (1926–2023), Italian-Greek philologist
Monica Vitti (1931–2022), Italian actress
Pablo Vitti (born 1985), Argentine footballer
Rafael Vitti (born 1995), Brazilian actor, musician, and poet